A meteorite find is a meteorite that was found by people, but whose fall was not observed. They may have been on Earth's surface for as many as thousands of years and therefore could have been subject to varying amounts of weathering.

Finds are distinguished from "meteorite falls", which are those which were observed during their descent and collected shortly afterwards.

All officially recognized meteorites are listed in databases such as the Meteoritical Bulletin Database, most of which have specimens in modern collections.

See also
Glossary of meteoritics
:Category:Meteorites by find location

References

External links
Meteorite databases
Meteoritical Bulletin Database
The NHM Catalogue of Meteorites
MetBase

Meteorite hunting